is a Prefectural Natural Park in Kanagawa Prefecture, Japan. The park lies wholly within the municipality of Manazuru.

See also
 National Parks of Japan

References

External links
  Map of Manazuru Hantō Prefectural Natural Park

Parks and gardens in Kanagawa Prefecture
Protected areas established in 1960
1960 establishments in Japan
Manazuru, Kanagawa